The European School of Oncology (ESO) is a provider of continuing medical education to oncology professionals, with a particular focus on areas of Central and Eastern Europe and the Balkans region.

History 
The School was founded in 1982 by Umberto Veronesi, an Italian breast surgeon and Scientific Director of the National Cancer Institute of Milan. The concept, first outlined at the 1981 founding congress of the European Society of Surgical Oncology, was for a permanent interdisciplinary and international school, free from non-medical influence, and in line with the medical traditions of the ‘Old Continent’ of Europe, which were seen as distinct from the medical culture in the USA, in putting a greater emphasis on the therapeutic importance of the doctor‒patient relationship.

The founding scientific leadership of the School was drawn from a range of oncology disciplines and European countries. They included Michael Peckham, a UK-based radiotherapist and co-founder of the European Society for Therapeutic Radiology and Oncology (now European Society for Radiotherapy and Oncology),; Herbert Pinedo, a leader in the emerging specialism of medical oncology, based in the Netherlands, and author of early editions of Cancer Chemotherapy; Franco Cavalli, a Swiss haematologist and founding member of the European Society for Medical Oncology, Louis Denis, a urologist and founder member of the European Organisation for Research and Treatment of Cancer genito-urinary group; and Umberto Veronesi himself, an Italian breast surgeon, who had developed and trialled the quadrantectomy technique for breast conserving surgery  and initiated the first trials investigating the impact of adjuvant chemotherapy in operable breast cancer.

Multiprofessional cancer care education 
The first ESO oncology course was held in 1982 in the Castello di Pomerio in Lombardy northern Italy, near Milan. The teaching faculty comprised most of the School’s founders, and the course covered the principles of management of the main cancers from a multidisciplinary standpoint. 
In its early years the School concentrated on post-graduate courses in medical oncology, which at that time was treated in most of Europe as a branch of internal medicine, rather than a specialism requiring its own curriculum and qualifications.
From 2001, the School began to focus much of its work on countries in Central and Eastern Europe and the Balkans region, where survival rates for cancer were markedly lower than in Western Europe and Northern Europe.
It also started to widen its areas of work to support oncologists at different stages in their careers, starting from the time they leave medical school.  In 2002 ESO ran the first five-day Masterclass in Clinical Oncology. In 2004 it initiated a summertime Oncology for Medical Students course. In 2008 the e-ESO distance learning programme was started, to increase global access to oncology education. In 2012 ESO launched a visiting professors programme, primarily to support clinical institutes in Eastern Europe and the Balkan Region. In 2013 it added a scheme for clinical training fellowships at centres of excellence across Europe, and also set up certificates of competence  as specialist qualifications in lymphoma, breast cancer, and gastrointestinal cancer, and a certificate of advanced studies in lung cancer, which run in collaboration with the University of Ulm, the University of Zurich and the Università della Svizzera italiana.
In 2020 the School set up the ESO college ESCO, to bring all these different initiatives into a structure that alumni can pursue step by step.

Societies 
ESO is a member of the Union for International Cancer Control and the European Cancer Organisation.

Journal 
The ESO official journal is Critical Reviews in Oncology/Hematology, which publishes critical reviews in all fields of oncology and hematology, as well as reviews and original research in the field of geriatric oncology.

References

External links 

 Official website

Continuing education
Medical schools in Italy
Non-profit organisations based in Italy
Educational institutions established in 1982
1982 establishments in Italy
Organisations based in Milan
Cancer organizations